Dolls Apartment is the debut album by the Japanese band Doll$Boxx. It was released on December 12, 2012, and reached number 56 on the Oricon chart.

Track listing

Personnel
 Fuki – vocals 
 F Chopper Koga – bass
  – drums, vocals
 Tomo-zo – guitar
  – keyboards, vocals

References

2012 debut albums
Doll$Boxx albums